Jannelle Kalyn Flaws (born November 15, 1991) is an American soccer player who plays as a forward for SV Meppen.

Career
Flaws was drafted by Chicago Red Stars in the 2016 NWSL College Draft. She made one appearance for Chicago in 2016.

References

External links
Illinois Fighting Illini bio

1991 births
Living people
American expatriate soccer players in Germany
American women's soccer players
BV Cloppenburg (women) players
Chicago Red Stars draft picks
Chicago Red Stars players
Frauen-Bundesliga players
Illinois Fighting Illini women's soccer players
National Women's Soccer League players
People from Glenview, Illinois
Soccer players from Illinois
2. Frauen-Bundesliga players
American expatriate women's soccer players
Women's association football forwards